is a Japanese footballer currently playing as a defender for V-Varen Nagasaki of J2 League.

Career statistics

Club
.

Notes

References

External links

2000 births
Living people
Association football people from Nagasaki Prefecture
Japanese footballers
Association football defenders
J2 League players
V-Varen Nagasaki players